Lasky is a surname. Notable people with the surname include:

Art Lasky (1909–1980), American heavyweight professional boxer
Bette Lasky (born 1947), American politician; New Hampshire state senator and former state representative
David Lasky (born 1967), American cartoonist
Dorothea Lasky (born 1978), American poet
Floria Lasky (1923–2007), American lawyer in the theater world
Jesse Louis Lasky (1880–1958), American movie producer and founder of Paramount Pictures 
Jesse L. Lasky, Jr. (1910–1988), American screenwriter, often with his wife Pat Silver-Lasky
Kathryn Lasky (born 1944), American author
Mark Lasky (1954–1983), American cartoonist
Melvin J. Lasky (1920–2004), American journalist
Mitch Lasky (born 1962), American venture capitalist
Pat Silver-Lasky, American actress, screenwriter, and writer, often with her husband Jesse Lasky, Jr.
Rick Lasky, American emergency services consultant, author, motivational speaker
Victor Lasky (1918–1990), American newspaper columnist and writer

See also
Laski (surname)
Laskey
Lasky, Ukraine